Play World Tour was the fourth concert tour by Taiwanese singer Jolin Tsai. It started on May 22, 2015, in Taipei, Taiwan at Taipei Arena and continued throughout Asia and North America before concluding on July 16, 2016, in Kuala Lumpur, Malaysia at Stadium Merdeka. It grossed NT$1.5 billion from 34 shows and 600,000 attendance.

Background and development 
On October 29, 2014, Tsai revealed that she would start preparing for her fourth concert tour after the release of Play, and the new tour would pay more attention to music. On February 15, 2015, she announced that she would embark on the Play World Tour in Taipei, Taiwan at Taipei Arena on May 22, 2015. On February 29, 2015, she flew to Los Angeles, United States to start a two-week dance rehearsal. At the same time, all the personnel of the tour flew to Los Angeles to begin the pre-production work. It was revealed that Tsai and all the dancers would rehearse on a one-to-one simulated temporary stage in Taipei, Taiwan two weeks before the start of the tour. On February 31, 2015, she released the promotional poster for the tour, which was shot by Chen Man, with Wyman Wong as the stylist. At the same time, she revealed that the tour would cooperate with the Live Nation Entertainment and would be co-directed by Travis Payne and Stacy Walker.

It was revealed that the cost of the tour exceeded NT$100 million, and all the stage design teams came from all over the world. At the same time, Jet Tone Film Production was invited to create five video interludes for the tour. In addition, Live Nation Entertainment held three dancer auditions in Los Angeles and finally selected 12 dancers. Live Nation Entertainment also invited 14 choreographers for the tour. On June 1, 2015, Tsai held a press conference in Beijing, China and announced a number of shows that would be held in China.

Commercial reception 
The ticket sale for the Taipei dates began on April 12, 2015, and all the 33,000 tickets were sold out within 18 minutes. Therefore, it was announced that an additional Taipei show would be held on May 25, 2015. The tickets for the additional Taipei show went on sale on April 15, 2015, and all the 11,000 tickets were sold out within six minutes. On May 24, 2015, Tsai announced that the tour would be held in Taipei, Taiwan on November 7 and 8, 2015. On June 13, 2015, the tickets for the Taipei shows on November 7 and 8, 2015 went on sale, and all the 22,000 tickets were sold out within 17 minutes. On August 15, 2015, she announced that an additional Taipei show would be held on November 6, 2015. On August 28, 2015, she announced that an additional Taipei show would be held on November 5, 2015. On September 5, 2015, the tickets for the Taipei shows on November 5 and 6, 2015 went on sale, and all the 22,000 tickets were sold out within 13 minutes.

Critical reception 
Taiwanese media personality Kevin Lee commented: "The level of this concert is completely beyond my surprise, the content, costume, singing, dancing, and stage design, they are completely at the international level, even surpassing it. This made me very proud that we have such outstanding and successful Chinese artist. It is full of sincerity and is totally worth the ticket price! And Jolin's flawless and precise stage performance has washed away my previous impression that artists who can dance but can't sing and artists who can sing but can't dance. I see that Jolin is one of the very few solid talents who can both dance and sing. In one of the parts, her opera performance made me moved and amazed by her singing ability who is good at dancing." Writing for PlayMusic, Shau commented: "In this concert, Jolin Tsai not only proved that she has the real ability to sing, but also showed her more and more comfortable side, winking playfully, declaring loudly that she is a 'barbie doll', she is not afraid of being alone on the stage, she picked up the microphone, and the audience held their breath for it. Jolin Tsai is the imprint of the youthful time of a group of people, however, the author believes that her trend will continue to spread, and the youthful time of another group of people will also be branded with the hot and unlimited charm of the queen."

Writing for ETtoday, Aping commented: "In this Play concert, even though Jolin Tsai has changed from being cool to full of jokes. She boldly took away the talking time, and removed the pommel horse, rings, and pole dance; but it doesn't mean that she didn't practice dancing seriously. All the songs were re-arranged, all the old dance moves were discarded, and six complete parts were used to give fans all of her. Jolin Tsai fully understands that even if the difficult moves were removed, she can still be a great artist on stage." BeautiMode commented: "It may be exaggerated to say so, but compared with the previous Myself World Tour and Dancing Forever World Tour, this time Jolin is indeed more comfortable and more like a superstar on the stage than before. When the curtain fell, Jolin, with the special decoration of robotic snakes on head, reappeared like the mythical Medusa, using her singing and dancing to petrify all the fans."

Video release 

On January 30, 2018, Tsai released a live video album Play World Tour for the tour. It includes the performances in Taipei, Taiwan at Taipei Arena during May 22–25, 2015 and four We're All Different, Yet the Same documentary films directed either by Hou Chi-jan or Gavin Lin, and one behind-the-scenes footage. The album was directed by Leo Hsu and post-produced by 3 Aqua Entertainment. In addition, Warner revealed that the concert video was filmed with a total of 26 ground and aerial cameras, and edited from 400 hours of material, and Tsai supervised the post-production of video for three times.

The physical format of the album was only released in Taiwan. It peaked at number one on the weekly video album sales in Taiwan, including Chia Chia, Eslite, Five Music, G-Music, Kuang Nan, PChome, Pok'elai. In 2018, it reached number one on the yearly video album sales chart of Pok'elai, number one on Kuang Nan, number seven on Chia Chia, and number five on Five Music. In addition, it reached number two on the yearly video album sales chart of YesAsia.

Set list 

 "Medusa"
 "Real Man"
 "Honey Trap"
 "Bravo Lover"
 "I'm Not Yours"
 "Agent J"
 "Butterfly"
 "Love Love Love"
 "Prague Square"
 "I Love, I Embrace"
 "Exclusive Myth"
 "The Great Artist"
 "Mr. Q"
 "Rewind"
 "The Smell of Lemon Grass"
 "I Know You're Feeling Blue"
 "Sky"
 "Butterflies in My Stomach"
 "Miss Trouble"
 "Queen of the Night Aria"
 "Sunshine in the Rain"
 "Nothing Left to Say"
 "You Gotta Know"
 "J-Game"
 "Fantasy"
 "36 Tricks of Love"
 "Phony Queen"
 "Dr. Jolin"
 "Dancing Diva"
 "Magic"
 "We're All Different, Yet the Same"
 "Out on the Street"
 "The Spirit of Knight"
 "Play"

Shows

Cancelled dates

Notes

References 

2015 concert tours
2016 concert tours
Concert tours of China
Concert tours of Malaysia
Concert tours of Singapore
Concert tours of Taiwan
Concert tours of the United States
Jolin Tsai concert tours